WQCC (106.3 FM, “Kicks 106.3”) is a commercial radio station  broadcasting a country music format. Licensed to La Crosse, Wisconsin, United States, the station serves the La Crosse area. The station is currently owned by Magnum Communications.

All the stations of the "La Crosse Radio Group" are housed at 1407 2nd Avenue North in Onalaska, Wisconsin.

History
The station went on the air as WLJO on February 10, 1993. On January 31, 1994, the station changed its call sign to the current WQCC.

Previous logos
 (WQCC's logo under previous "CC106.3" branding)
 (WQCC’s previous logo)

References

External links

QCC
Country radio stations in the United States
Radio stations established in 1993
1993 establishments in Wisconsin